Travel de Courcey was a bus and coach operator based near Coventry in the West Midlands region of England. It operated local bus services in the Coventry and Warwickshire area and National Express contracts.

History

Mike de Courcey Travel was founded in 1972 by Mike de Courcey. It expanded into bus service operations after the Transport Act 1985 deregulated the UK bus industry.

In June 2011, Mike de Courcey Travel took over the Birmingham depot of Veolia Transport and several National Express contracts from them. In April 2017 Mike de Courcey Travel was awarded the Queen's Awards for Enterprise in the sustainable development category.

On 24 August 2020, the operator fell into administration, citing a steep decline of passenger numbers in the wake of the COVID-19 pandemic. Stagecoach took over the running of the routes 60 and 703 and Arriva took over the running of route X6 between Leicester and Coventry.

Services
Mike de Courcey Travel operated a number of local bus services, many from the University of Warwick, as well as school services under contract to Warwickshire County Council.

As of 2012, Mike de Courcey Travel operated services under contract to National Express on these routes:
210 Birmingham - Gatwick Airport
325 Birmingham - Manchester
384 Birmingham - Llandudno
387 Coventry - Blackpool
410 Wolverhampton - London
420 Wolverhampton - London
540 Manchester - London
Former significant bus routes:
Until July 2016, Travel de Courcey operated 360A/360C Coventry City Circular, the longest urban bus route in Europe at 31 miles.

References

External links

Company website

Bus operators in the West Midlands (county)
Former coach operators in England
Transport companies established in 1972
Transport companies disestablished in 2020
Transport in Birmingham, West Midlands
Transport in Coventry
Transport in Warwickshire
1972 establishments in England
2020 disestablishments in England